Cleburne State Park is a  Texas state park in Johnson County, Texas operated by the Texas Parks and Wildlife Department.

The park is reached via US 67 to Park Road 21.

History
Cleburne State Park is named for the nearby town of Cleburne, Texas.  It was opened in 1939 after purchase from the city.  Earlier Comanche Indians hunted in the area and had a trail passing through.

Flora and fauna
The park is heavily wooded with cedar, oak, elm, mesquite, redbud, cottonwood, sycamore, ash and sumac trees. The ground is rocky. Animal life includes white-tailed deer, turkey, duck, armadillo, squirrel, skunk, bobcat, swamp rabbit, cottontail rabbit, raccoon, opossum, coyote, beaver, and many species of birds.  Species of fish in Cedar Lake include crappie, bass, catfish, bluegill, and red ear sunfish.

Facilities
Cleburne State Park has a variety of campsites. All sites include a picnic table, grill and a campfire ring. Restrooms with hot showers are available nearby all camping areas.

Tent and parking space with water are common.

Back-in campsites with utilities and shelters accommodate up to 8 people and combination of motor vehicles/trailers.

Group Camp consists of a 2 group barracks with twin beds and mattresses sleeping a total of 44 people. The dining hall and kitchen seat approximately 70 people and has some cooking equipment.  All buildings are heated but no air-conditioning.

Camp Creek flows through the park.

Activities

Fishing is an extremely popular activity on the lake. Any size boat is allowed on Cedar Lake, but the speed on the lake is restricted to No Wake. Personal Water Crafts or PWCs are not allowed since Cedar Lake is considered a community fishing lake, since it is totally encompassed by the state park.

 of mountain bike trails of various skill levels are available in a loop around the park. The terrain on the trail is diverse, including hills and flats.  Hiking is also allowed on these trails and there are at least two geocaches located in the park.

There is an entrance fee to the park, at 6 dollars for 13 and older, and reservations are recommended.

References

External links

Cleburne State Park

Protected areas of Johnson County, Texas
State parks of Texas
Civilian Conservation Corps in Texas
Tourist attractions in Johnson County, Texas
Cleburne, Texas